The One Cook Islands Movement, formerly known as "Cook Islands One" is a political party in the Cook Islands. It was established in May 2014.

The party was founded by former Cabinet Minister Teina Bishop after his resignation from Cabinet and expulsion from the Cook Islands Party. The party planned to contest the 2014 elections, but only ran 8 candidates with the explicit aim of being a support partner to the government. Following his expulsion from the CIP, George Angene announced that he would be joining One Cook Islands.

The party ran four candidates in the 2014 election, in the seats of Tupapa-Maraerenga, Arutanga-Reureu-Nikaupara, Mauke and Pukapuka-Nassau. It won two seats.

In the 2018 election, it won one seat.

Electoral performance

Legislative Assembly

References